Confetti's was a Belgian new beat band from the 1980s. Its producers were Serge Ramaekers and Dominique Sas, sometimes credited as The Maxx (not the same as Maxx, a shorter-lived German project from the mid-1990s). On stage, Confetti's was fronted by singer Peter Renkens and female dancers Marleen, Tania, Hilde and Daniëlla. 
The band became one of the first to break through into mainstream music as a new beat act. Their most successful period was 1988–1989 with international hits like "The Sound of C" and "C in China". Other releases were "Keep Smiling", "C Countdown", "C Day Live" and "Circling Stars". One year after releasing their last single "Put ‘M Up" in 1990, the original setting of Confetti's withdrew from the spotlight. 

At the beginning of 2009, the act was revived as a tribute act under the adapted name 'The Confettis', with the artist who was the inspiration for the group and founder of the new beat dance, namely Geert Tanghe, former European champion mime and robotic dancer. At the time, he had already been asked for the group and had made a persiflage under the name "Serpentins" on various new beat underground acts that had been set up in the 1980s. With this, he had success and the video of his tournée was used several times as inspiration of the first Confetti occupation. He himself was professionally active in the development of a futuristic act, first under the name Man Machine with singles "UFO", "IFO" and "The Best Ever Seen". Later he developed Laserman with singles including "Technology" and "One Two" and toured with this act worldwide.

Geert took the act and together with his partner Sophie, he developed both a nostalgic and contemporary concept with new dancers. The act experienced further evolutions in collaboration, first with USA Import Music and later with La Musique du Beau Monde. In 2014, a remix single of "The Sound of C" was released with a re-use by X-Tof and in 2018, together with original producer Serge Ramaekers, a total remake single was made that was both integrated by the Confettis in every show.

In 2019, the concept had an expansion under the name the Confettis 2.0. Both Geert and Sophie now bring the songs together vocally, and by moving the singer / dancer to the forefront, the act is capable of performing as a party act showcasing the evolution of music from the 1980s to the 1990s with the Confettis as a central theme.

"The Sound of C"
Their first release, "The Sound of C" stands for the Belgian club Confetti's in Brasschaat, near Antwerp. Serge Ramaekers and Dominique Sas were working on a marketing campaign to gain more publicity for the club. One of the barmen at Confetti's (Peter Renkens) became the face of the marketing campaign, which included the single "The Sound of C". To shoot a music video the band was dropped at the main shopping street in Antwerp De Meir and performed "The Sound of C" in front of hundred citizens passing by. Due to the success of the first single, a live act was put together and Confetti's traveled the world to promote their new beat music. On stage, singer Peter always wore a captain's uniform. The dress code for new beat was black and white clothes combined with childish accessories. In 1989, they released their only album, 92… Our First Album. Renkens' uniform was later changed to that of a Canadian Mountie.

Discography

Albums
92…Our First Album (1989)

Singles

References
Belgian Music Archief
 Interview Radio 1 with DJ Tiesto

External links
 
 
 "The Sound Of C" music video on YouTube

Belgian new beat music groups
Belgian techno music groups
Belgian Eurodance groups
Musical groups established in 1988
Musical groups disestablished in 1991
1988 establishments in Belgium
1991 disestablishments in Belgium